Craig James Melville is an Australian television comedy director. He is best known for his collaborations with comedians John Safran, Lawrence Leung and The Chaser.

Filmography

Television 
 Maximum Choppage Series Director (2015)
 The Elegant Gentleman's Guide to Knife Fighting – Director (2013)
 Lawrence Leung's Unbelievable Director / Producer (2011)
 John Safran's Race Relations Director / Producer (2009)
 The Chaser's War on Everything: Series 1, 2 & 3 – Director / Producer (2006–2009)
 Lawrence Leung's Choose Your Own Adventure – Director / Producer (2008)
 The Chaser Decides: Series 2 – Director  /Producer (2007)
 Speaking in Tongues – Director / Producer (2005–2006)
 John Safran vs God Director (2004–2005)
 John Safran's Music Jamboree Segment Director (2002)
 The Late Report John Safran Segment Director (1999)
 John Safran: Media Tycoon Director (1998)
 John Safran: Master Chef Director (1998)

Music clips 
 The Bedroom Philosopher – "Northcote (So Hungover)" (2010) The Bedroom Philosopher: Northcote (So Hungover)
 TISM – "Thunderbirds Are Coming Out" (1998) TISM_Thunderbirds
 TISM – "Whatareya?" (1998)
 Magic Dirt – "She-Riff" (1999) MagicDirt
 Frenzal Rhomb – 'We're Going Out Tonight" (2000)
 Frank Bennett – "Opportunities", "Let's Make Lots of Money" (1999)
 Josh Abrahams – "Addicted to Bass" (1998)
 John Safran – "Not the Sunscreen Song" (1997)

Short film 
 The Polygamist (2013)
 Smithston (2013)
 Dentally Disturbed (co-director) (2004)
 Brief Fiction (1996)

Awards

Television Awards 
Maximum Choppage (ABC)
Australian Directors' Guild - Best Comedy - Nomination 

John Safran's Race Relations (ABC)
Australian Directors' Guild – Best Comedy – Nomination
Australian Directors' Guild – Best Reality / Light Entertainment – Nomination
Rose D'or 2010 – Best Comedy – Nomination (Producers: John Safran & Laura Waters)
Rose D'or 2010 – Social Award – Nomination  (Producers: John Safran & Laura Waters)

Lawrence Leung's Unbelievable (ABC)
Australian Directors' Guild Awards – Best Television Comedy – Nomination 2009

Lawrence Leung's Choose Your Own Adventure (ABC)
AFI Awards – Nomination – Best Television Comedy 2009
Australian Directors' Guild Awards – Best Achievement in Television Comedy – Nomination

The Chaser's War on Everything (ABC) 
AFI Award 2006 – Best Television Comedy – Winner (Producers: Mark FitzGerald, Julian Morrow, Andy Nehl)
AFI Award 2007 – Best Television Comedy – Nomination (Producers: Andy Nehl, Julian Morrow, Jo Wathen)
Logie Award 2008 – Most Outstanding Comedy Program – Nomination
 
John Safran vs God
AFI Award – Winner – Best Television Comedy (Producers: John Safran and Selin Yaman)
Logie Awards – Nomination – Most Outstanding Comedy Program
 
John Safran's Music Jamboree director – various segments 
AFI Award – Winner – Best Comedy Series – 2003 (Producers: Selin Yaman & John Safran)  
Logie Awards – Nomination – Most Outstanding Comedy Program – 2003

Music Video Awards

Short Film Awards 
The Polygamist
 Iron Mule Comedy Festival New York – Judges Favourite Award

Dentally Disturbed (co-director) (2004) SF_Dentally_Disturbed
 Flickerfest 2005 – Sydney – Winner of SBS Television Award
 Portland International Film Festival (USA) – Audience Choice Award 2005
 Down Under Film Festival 'Best Australian Short Comedy' 2005
 Sony Tropfest 'Best of the Rest' competition winner 
 London Rushes Soho Short Film Festival – Best Newcomer – Runner up 
 Angry Film Festival – Runner-up 

Brief Fiction (1996)
 Gold – Australian Cinematographers Society Awards 1996

Love Hurts
 Silver – Australian Cinematographers Society Awards – Fictional Drama Shorts – Cinema and TV 1999

References

External links 
 
 Craig Melville's Home Page
 Jungleboys Director's Page
 The Chaser's War on Everything – Home Page
 John Safran vs God Home Page
 Music Jamboree Home Page
 Speaking in Tongues Home Page 
 MVDbase
 The Money Shot 

Year of birth missing (living people)
Living people
Australian television directors
Australian documentary filmmakers
Australian music video directors
Film directors from Melbourne
Australian television producers